Tōjin Okichi,  Okichi, Mistress of a Foreigner or Mistress of a Foreigner, is a 1930 silent drama film by Kenji Mizoguchi, based on the novel by Gisaburō Jūichiya. Only a fragment of the film has survived.

Cast
 Kaichi Yamamoto
 Yōko Umemura
 Kōji Shima
 Takihika Hisako

Background
Tazuko Sakane, who later became the first Japanese woman director, served as script assistant and assistant director on the film.

Jūichiya's novel was again adapted for film in 1937 under the title Tōjin Okichi Kurofune jōwa.

Home media
A 4-minute-long sequence has been published on DVD as complement to Mizoguchi's Orizuru Osen by Digital MEME in 2007.

References

External links
 

1930 films
Films based on Japanese novels
Films directed by Kenji Mizoguchi
Nikkatsu films
Lost Japanese films
Japanese black-and-white films
Japanese silent films
Japanese drama films
1930 drama films
Silent drama films